The filmography of American actor Paul Wesley comprises both film and television roles. He has appeared in over fourteen feature films, and twenty-seven television films and series.

Films

Television

Web

References

External links
 

Wesley, Paul
Wesley, Paul